The Afro-Colombian Mural: Currulao y Desplazamiento, located at 1344 U Street NW, Washington D.C., is a public mural that celebrates the Afro-Colombian culture of the District and increases public awareness about the widespread displacement and other human rights violations related to the ongoing armed conflict in Colombia. The mural was funded by the DC Commission on the Arts and Humanities.

The artist and inspiration for the mural 
The mural was made by the internationally recognized muralist Joel Bergner and his organization Action Ashé! Global Art & Social Action Initiative. Bergner collaborated with many D.C. Afro-Colombian community members who had fled Colombia to seek asylum status in the US, and sought their guidance in how to best illustrate the grave human rights situation in that country.

Bergner also traveled to the Pacific Coast region of Colombia where the conflict is often most severe to visit his friends’ families, do research, and learn more about the political situation. This trip greatly contributed to the mural's imagery.

The size of the woman in the mural and the people underneath her portray the importance of Afro-Colombian traditions and culture. The colors are strong, warm, intriguing and welcoming. The encouraging images are in a paradox with the depiction of the Colombian paramilitary, with people running from these forces.

Public reception 
The mural was unveiled at with a public event featuring speeches from the Afro-Colombian activist  Marino Córdoba and a local DC council member, as well as live music, traditional Afro-Colombian food, and a traditional dance presentation by the local Afro-Colombian dance group Tangaré. The event was co-sponsored by TransAfrica Forum and the US Network in Solidarity for Afro-Colombian Grassroots Communities (NASGACC)].

References 

Murals in Washington, D.C.
2009 paintings